The 2006–07 Hong Kong FA Cup was the 33rd staging of the Hong Kong FA Cup. The competition started on 21 April 2007 with 10 Hong Kong First Division clubs. Four of them took part in the first round to determine which team advanced to the quarter finals. From quarter finals onward, the cup competition was a single-elimination tournament.

Due to sponsorship deal with the Dongguan LANWA Group Co. Ltd, the event was officially known as 2006/07 HKFA Lanwa International FA Cup.

Although all the matches before the final was held at the Mongkok Stadium, the final was staged at the Hong Kong Stadium on 19 May 2007. South China defeated Happy Valley 3-1 in the final, to secure their ninth title and along with the domestic treble (Hong Kong First Division League champions, Hong Kong Senior Shield champions and the cup).

South China, as the winners of Hong Kong FA Cup, represented Hong Kong in the Barclays Asia Trophy 2007 in July and played against the Premier League teams Liverpool F.C., Portsmouth F.C. and Fulham F.C.

Teams
Citizen
Happy Valley
HKFC
Hong Kong 08
Kitchee
Lanwa Redbull
Rangers
South China
Wofoo Tai Po
Xiangxue Sun Hei

Fixtures and results 

All times are Hong Kong Time (UTC+8).

Bracket

First round

Quarter-finals

Semi-finals

Final

Top goalscorers
4 goals
 Tales Schutz of South China

3 goals
 Cheng Siu Wai of South China
 Detinho of South China

2 goals
 Gerard Ambassa Guy of Happy Valley
 Law Chun Bong of Happy Valley
 Sham Kwok Keung of Happy Valley
 Julius Akosah of Kitchee
 Aldo Villaba of Lanwa Redbull

1 goal
 Delphin Tshibanda Tshibangu of Citizen
 Jorginho of Citizen
 Denisson Ricardo De Souza of Happy Valley
 Hamilton Timbira Dias Dos Santos Junior of Happy Valley
 Poon Yiu Cheuk of Happy Valley
 Ling Cong of Lanwa Redbull
 Ye Nan of Lanwa Redbull
 Chan Siu Ki of Kitchee
 Darko Rakocevic of Kitchee
 Wisdom Fofo Agbo of Rangers
 Cleiton of South China
 Lo Chi Kwan of Xiangxue Sun Hei
 Chan Chi Hong of South China

Prizes

Team awards
Champion (HKD$80,000 + HKD$500,000 for the team to participate in Barclays Asia Trophy 2007): South China (9th title)

Individual awards 
Top Scorer (HKD$5,000):  Tales Schutz of South China
Best Defender (HKD$5,000):  Denisson Ricardo De Souza of Happy Valley

Trivia
 Happy Valley have been the 1st runner-up of FA Cup for the third consecutive season, they suffered their 8th loss in a row in cup finals of local competitions.

See also
Hong Kong FA Cup
The Hong Kong Football Association
2006-07 in Hong Kong football
Hong Kong First Division League 2006-07
Hong Kong League Cup 2006-07
Hong Kong Senior Shield 2006-07
Barclays Asia Trophy 2007

References

External links
FA Cup, The Hong Kong Football Association website.
2006/07 HKFA Lanwa International FA Cup, The Hong Kong Football Association website.
2006/2007 HKFA LANWA INTERNATIONAL FA CUP Bracket, The Hong Kong Football Association website.

Hong Kong FA Cup
Hong Kong FA Cup
FA Cup